Rolf Aalerud (6 December 1921 - 22 May 2011) was a Norwegian engineer and politician for the Christian Democratic Party.

He served as a deputy representative to the Parliament of Norway from Hedmark during the term 1981–1985. In total he met during 1 day of parliamentary session. In 1953 he founded his own engineer company in the heating, ventilation, and air conditioning field. The company evolved to the limited company Aalerud. He resided in Brumunddal.

References

1921 births
2011 deaths
People from Ringsaker
Deputy members of the Storting
Christian Democratic Party (Norway) politicians
Hedmark politicians